Bob and Mike Bryan were the defending champions, but chose not to participate this year.

Andrés Molteni and Horacio Zeballos won the title, defeating Johan Brunström and Andreas Siljeström in the final, 7–6(7–2), 6–4.

Seeds

Draw

Draw

References
 Main Draw

2016 US Open Series
BBandT Atlanta Open - Doubles
2016 Doubles
Atlanta